During the 1971–72 Dutch football season, AFC Ajax competed in the Eredivisie. Ajax won the Treble that season, winning the Eredivisie, the 1971–72 KNVB Cup and the 1971–72 European Cup. It was the club's first season without Rinus Michels since 1965.

First-team squad

Transfers

In

Out

Out mid season

Results
In the 1971–72 season Ajax lost just one game. They  were unbeaten at home in both domestic and European competitions. The season included a 12-1 victory over Vitesse at the De Meer Stadion. A result which set a record for the largest win in Eredivisie history. It would stand until 2020, when Ajax beat VVV-Venlo 13–0.

Eredivisie

KNVB Cup

European Cup

Statistics

Goals record

References

External links
 RSSSF
 Eredivisie official website – info on all seasons 
 Netherlands Cup Full Results 1970–1994 by the RSSSF

AFC Ajax seasons
AFC Ajax
UEFA Champions League-winning seasons
Dutch football championship-winning seasons